The year 1987 was the 16th year after the independence of Bangladesh. It was also the sixth year of the Government of Hussain Muhammad Ershad.

Incumbents

 President: Hussain Muhammad Ershad
 Prime Minister: Mizanur Rahman Chowdhury
 Chief Justice: F.K.M. Munim

Demography

Climate

Cyclonic Storm/Tidal Surge/Floods
 On 5 June midnight a deep depression (previously formed in the Bay of Bengal) crossed Hatiya, Sandwip, Patuakhali and Bhola region as a cyclonic storm accompanied by tidal wave up to 6 feet above normal and inundated low-lying islands.
 Heavy rains in entire southern region caused flash floods in a few areas.
 Overall flood situation seriously deteriorated following heavy rains on 30/31 July and onrush flood water from upper region. Worst affected districts Rangpur, Netrokona, Gaibandha, Naogaon, Kurigram, Jamalpur, Cox's Bazar, Chittagong and Noakhali. About 3.5 million people were reported affected and approx. 650,000 acres crops considerably damaged. Road link from capital to north-eastern region were disrupted due overflow water and collapse of culverts.

Economy

Note: For the year 1987 average official exchange rate for BDT was 30.95 per US$.

Events

 21 October – The Bangladesh Civil Service Administration Academy was established.
 10 November – Bangladeshi activist Noor Hossain was killed by the Bangladesh Police while protesting against the rule of President Hussain Muhammad Ershad near zero point in Dhaka.
 28 November – Hussain Muhammad Ershad declares state of emergency and bans strikes. All educational institutes are declared closed until 4 December.
 7 December – Hussain Muhammad Ershad dissolves parliament under the pressure of opposition.

Awards and recognitions

International Recognition
 Richard William Timm, was awarded Ramon Magsaysay Award for his work in Bangladesh.

Independence Day Award

Ekushey Padak
 Mohammad Moniruzzaman (literature)
 Abu Hena Mustafa Kamal (music)
 Anis Siddiky
 Jahanara Arzu (literature)
 Ahmad Shamsul Islam (education)
 M. A. Naser (education)
 Principal Abul Kashem (education)
 Nurul Islam Patowary (journalism)
 Ahmed Humayun (journalism)
 Kanailal Shil (instrumental music)
 Farida Parveen (music)
 Syed Mainul Hossain (architecture)

Sports
 South Asian (Federation) Games:
 Bangladesh participated in the third South Asian Federation Games held in Kolkata from 20–27 November. With 3 golds, 20 silvers and 37 bronzes Bangladesh ended the tournament at the fourth position in overall points table.
 Domestic football:
 Mohammedan SC won Dhaka League title while Abahani KC became runner-up.
 Mohammedan SC also won Bangladesh Federation Cup title.
 Chess:
 Niaz Murshed became the first South Asian to secure Grandmaster title.

Births
 24 March – Shakib Al Hasan, cricketer
 4 April – Ahona Rahman, model and actor
 9 June – Mushfiqur Rahim, cricketer
 2 August – Abdul Baten Mojumdar Komol, footballer
 5 October – Mozeza Ashraf Monalisa, model and actor
 30 October – Junaid Siddique, cricketer
 25 December – Jahid Hasan Ameli, footballer
 25 December – Ashiqur Rahman, screenplay writer and director

Deaths
 20 February – AKM Samsuzzoha, politician (b. 1924)
 3 March – S. A. Bari, politician (b. 1927)
 6 May – Muhammadullah Hafezzi, politician (b. 1895)
 5 July – Mohammad Farhad, politician (b. 1938)
 2 August – Abu Sayeed Chowdhury, former president (b. 1921)
 19 September – Muhammad Mansuruddin, author (b. 1904)
 1 October – Abdur Rahim, Islamic scholar (b. 1918)
 27 October – Anwara Bahar Chowdhury, social activist and author (b. 1919)
 29 November – Mohammad Toaha, politician (b. 1922)
 28 December – Happy Akhand, musician (b. 1960)

See also 
 1980s in Bangladesh
 Timeline of Bangladeshi history

References